Berhane may refer to the following people:

Berhane Abrehe, Minister of Finance of Eritrea
Berhane Adere, Ethiopian athlete
Berhane Aregai, Eritrean footballer
Berhane Asfaw, Ethiopian paleontologist
Berhane Habtemariam, Minister of Finance of Eritrea

See also
Helen Berhane
Natnael Berhane
Senai Berhane (born 1989), Eritrean footballer
Amain Berhene, American Musician